Walter Moses Burton (August 9, 1840 – June 4, 1913) was a farmer, sheriff, and Republican politician who served four terms in the Texas State Senate.  Born into slavery in North Carolina in 1840, he was brought to Texas about 1850.  His owner, Thomas Burke Burton, a plantation owner in Fort Bend County, taught him to read and write. After emancipation, he purchased several tracts of land from his former owner.  He became active in Republican party politics and was elected as the sheriff and tax collector in Fort Bend County in 1869. He was the first Black elected sheriff in the United States. He was first elected to the Fourteenth Legislature in 1874 and served almost continually until 1883. After leaving office, he returned to farming, but continued to be active in the Republican party until his death in 1913.  He is buried in the Morton Cemetery in Richmond, Texas.

See also the Jaybird-Woodpecker War.

References

External links
Texas Legislators: Past & Present - Walter Burton
Handbook of Texas Online - Walter Moses Burton
Forever Free: Nineteenth Century African-American Legislators and Constitutional Convention Delegates of Texas
Findagrave - Walter Moses Burton
Walter Moses Burton (1829?-1913)
The Illuminating History of Walter Burton

Republican Party Texas state senators
1840 births
1913 deaths
American freedmen
19th-century American politicians
African-American politicians during the Reconstruction Era
African-American state legislators in Texas
20th-century African-American politicians
20th-century American politicians
African-American men in politics
Farmers from Texas
African-American sheriffs
Texas sheriffs